Janvier South is a hamlet in northern Alberta, Canada within the Regional Municipality (RM) of Wood Buffalo. Whle the hamlet's official name is Janvier South according to Alberta Municipal Affairs, it is also known and referred to as Janvier by the RM of Wood Buffalo and its residents. It is further alternately known as Chard. The latter name is after A. Chard, a transportation official.

Demographics 

The population of Janvier South according to the 2018 municipal census conducted by the Regional Municipality of Wood Buffalo is 141, a decrease from its 2012 municipal census population count of 171.

See also 
List of communities in Alberta
List of designated places in Alberta
List of hamlets in Alberta

References 

Hamlets in Alberta
Designated places in Alberta
Regional Municipality of Wood Buffalo
Dene communities